This is a list of 1995 British incumbents.

Government
 Monarch
 Head of State - Elizabeth II, Queen of the United Kingdom (1952–2022)
 Prime Minister
 Head of Government - John Major, Prime Minister of the United Kingdom (1990–1997)
First Lord of the Treasury
 John Major, First Lord of the Treasury (1990–1997)
Chancellor of the Exchequer
 Kenneth Clarke, Chancellor of the Exchequer (1993–1997)
Second Lord of the Treasury
 Kenneth Clarke, Second Lord of the Treasury (1993–1997)
Secretary of State for Foreign and Commonwealth Affairs
 Douglas Hurd, Secretary of State for Foreign and Commonwealth Affairs (1989–1995)
 Malcolm Rifkind, Secretary of State for Foreign and Commonwealth Affairs (1995–1997)
Secretary of State for the Home Department
 Michael Howard, Secretary of State for the Home Department (1993–1997)
Secretary of State for Transport
 Brian Mawhinney, Secretary of State for Transport (1994–1995)
 Sir George Young, Bt., Secretary of State for Transport (1995–1997)
Secretary of State for Scotland
 Ian Lang, Secretary of State for Scotland (1990–1995)
 Michael Forsyth, Secretary of State for Scotland (1995–1997)
Secretary of State for Health
 Virginia Bottomley, Secretary of State for Health (1992–1995)
 Stephen Dorrell, Secretary of State for Health (1995–1997)
Secretary of State for Northern Ireland
 Sir Patrick Mayhew, Secretary of State for Northern Ireland (1992–1997)
Secretary of State for Defence
 Malcolm Rifkind, Secretary of State for Defence (1992–1995)
 Michael Portillo, Secretary of State for Defence (1995–1997)
Secretary of State for Trade and Industry
 Michael Heseltine, Secretary of State for Trade and Industry (1992–1995)
 Ian Lang, Secretary of State for Trade and Industry (1995–1997)
Secretary of State for National Heritage
 Stephen Dorrell, Secretary of State for National Heritage (1994–1995)
 Virginia Bottomley, Secretary of State for National Heritage (1995–1997)
Secretary of State for Education and Employment
 Gillian Shepherd, Secretary of State for Education (1994–1995)
 Gillian Shepherd, Secretary of State for Education and Employment (1995–1997)
Secretary of State for Wales
 John Redwood, Secretary of State for Wales (1993–1995)
 David Hunt, Secretary of State for Wales (1995)
 William Hague, Secretary of State for Wales (1995–1997)
Lord Privy Seal
 Robert Gascoyne-Cecil, 7th Marquess of Salisbury, Lord Privy Seal (1994–1997)
Leader of the House of Commons
 Tony Newton, Leader of the House of Commons (1992–1997)
Lord President of the Council
 Tony Newton, Lord President of the Council (1992–1997)
Lord Chancellor
 James Mackay, Baron Mackay of Clashfern, Lord Chancellor (1987–1997)
Secretary of State for Social Security
 Peter Lilley, Secretary of State for Social Security (1992–1997)
Chancellor of the Duchy of Lancaster
 David Hunt, Chancellor of the Duchy of Lancaster (1994–1995)
 Roger Freeman, Chancellor of the Duchy of Lancaster (1995–1997)

Religion
 Archbishop of Canterbury
George Carey, Archbishop of Canterbury (1991–2002)
 Archbishop of York
 John Habgood, Archbishop of York (1983–1995; retired before 8 September)
 David Hope, Archbishop of York (1995–2005; installed 8 December)

1995
Leaders
British incumbents